The 1950 Wichita Shockers football team, sometimes known as the Wheatshockers, was an American football team that represented Wichita  University (now known as Wichita State University) as a member of the Missouri Valley Conference during the 1950 college football season. In its third season under head coach Jim Trimble, the team compiled a 5–4–1 record (3–2 against conference opponents), finished third out of six teams in the MVC, and was outscored by a total of 243 to 203. The team played its home games at Veterans Field, now known as Cessna Stadium.

Schedule

References

Wichita
Wichita State Shockers football seasons
Wichita Shockers football